Andreas Johnny Lilja (born July 13, 1975) is a Swedish former professional ice hockey defenceman who played twelve seasons in the National Hockey League (NHL) for the Los Angeles Kings, Florida Panthers, Detroit Red Wings, Anaheim Ducks, and Philadelphia Flyers.

Lilja was a member of the 2008 Stanley Cup winning Red Wings, and was one of several Swedish players Detroit boasted on their roster.

Playing career
Lilja was drafted in the 2nd round, 54th overall by the Los Angeles Kings in the 2000 NHL Entry Draft. During the 2002–03 NHL season, Lilja was traded to the Florida Panthers where he played for the remainder of the season. In the summer of 2004, he was signed by the Nashville Predators, but never played for them because of the NHL lockout, during which he played for Mora IK and the Malmö IF Redhawks of Elitserien, as well as HC Ambri-Piotta of the Swiss National League A. Once the lockout ended, he was signed to a one-year deal by the Detroit Red Wings. After playing in all 82 regular season games for the Red Wings in the 2005–06 NHL season, he was re-signed by the team to a two-year deal in the summer of 2006. Lilja was re-signed again to another two-year deal in the summer of 2008.

Lilja won the 2008 Stanley Cup as a member of the Red Wings. He is also one of 9 native Swedes who played for the team at that time.
On October 10, 2010, after being released from a tryout with the San Jose Sharks, Lilja signed a one-year contract with the Anaheim Ducks.

Lilja signed a two-year, $1.475 million contract with the Philadelphia Flyers on July 1, 2011.

On April 6, 2013, Lilja signed a two-year contract with Rögle BK which begins with the 2013–14 season. He retired following the 2014–15 season.

Personal life
Lilja and his wife Lotta have two daughters. The family resides in Royal Oak, Michigan.

Career statistics

References

External links
 

1975 births
Living people
Adirondack Phantoms players
Anaheim Ducks players
Detroit Red Wings players
Florida Panthers players
Grand Rapids Griffins players
HC Ambrì-Piotta players
Los Angeles Kings draft picks
Los Angeles Kings players
Lowell Lock Monsters players
Malmö Redhawks players
Manchester Monarchs (AHL) players
Mora IK players
Philadelphia Flyers players
Rögle BK players
Sportspeople from Helsingborg
Stanley Cup champions
Swedish expatriate sportspeople in Switzerland
Swedish expatriate ice hockey players in the United States
Swedish ice hockey defencemen